Yorkshire West was a European Parliament constituency covering the western parts of West Yorkshire in England, including Bradford and Halifax.

Prior to its uniform adoption of proportional representation in 1999, the United Kingdom used first-past-the-post for the European elections in England, Scotland and Wales. The European Parliament constituencies used under that system were smaller than the later regional constituencies and only had one Member of the European Parliament each.

When it was created in England in 1979, it consisted of the Westminster Parliament constituencies of Bradford North, Bradford South, Bradford West, Brighouse and Spenborough, Halifax, Keighley, Shipley and Sowerby. In 1984, Batley and Spen and Calder Valley replaced Brighouse and Spenborough, and Sowerby, but Batley and Spen was removed again in 1994.

The area was later included in the Yorkshire and the Humber European Parliament Constituency, which was represented by seven members in 1999–2004 and six from 2004 onwards.

Boundaries 
1979–1984: Bradford North; Bradford South; Bradford West; Brighouse and Spenborough; Halifax; Keighley; Shipley; Sowerby.

1984–1994: Batley and Spen; Bradford North; Bradford South; Bradford West; Calder Valley; Halifax; Keighley; Shipley.

1994–1999: Bradford North; Bradford South; Bradford West; Calder Valley; Halifax; Keighley; Shipley.

Members of the European Parliament

Results

References

External links
 David Boothroyd's United Kingdom Election Results

European Parliament constituencies in England (1979–1999)
Politics of West Yorkshire
History of West Yorkshire
Political history of Yorkshire
1979 establishments in England
1999 disestablishments in England
Constituencies established in 1979
Constituencies disestablished in 1999